Killian Peier (born 28 March 1995) is a Swiss ski jumper.

Career
He competed at the FIS Nordic World Ski Championships 2013 in Val di Fiemme, where he placed 10th in the team jumping with the Swiss team. He represented Switzerland at the FIS Nordic World Ski Championships 2015 in Falun.

At the FIS Nordic World Ski Championships 2019 he took the bronze medal at the large hill event at the Bergisel Ski Jump in Innsbruck.

Record

World Championship

References

External links

1995 births
Living people
Swiss male ski jumpers
Ski jumpers at the 2012 Winter Youth Olympics
Ski jumpers at the 2022 Winter Olympics
FIS Nordic World Ski Championships medalists in ski jumping
Olympic ski jumpers of Switzerland